A gossip columnist is someone who writes a gossip column in a newspaper or magazine, especially a gossip magazine. Gossip columns are material written in a light, informal style, which relates the gossip columnist's opinions about the personal lives or conduct of celebrities from show business (motion picture movie stars, theater, and television actors), politicians, professional sports stars, and other wealthy people or public figures. Some gossip columnists broadcast segments on radio and television.

The columns mix factual material on arrests, divorces, marriages and pregnancies, obtained from official records, with more speculative gossip stories, rumors, and innuendo about romantic relationships, affairs, and purported personal problems.

Gossip columnists have a reciprocal relationship with the celebrities whose private lives are splashed about in the gossip column's pages. While gossip columnists sometimes engage in (borderline) defamatory conduct, spreading innuendo about alleged immoral or illegal conduct that can injure celebrities' reputations, they also are an important part of the "Star System" publicity machine that turns movie actors and musicians into celebrities and superstars that are the objects of the public's obsessive attention and interest. The publicity agents of celebrities often provide or "leak" information or rumors to gossip columnists to publicize the celebrity or their projects, or to counteract "bad press" that has recently surfaced about their conduct.

Libel and defamation
While gossip columnists' "bread and butter" is rumor, innuendo, and allegations of scandalous behavior, there is a fine line between the legally-acceptable spreading of rumors and the making of defamatory statements, the latter of which can provoke a lawsuit. Newspaper and magazine editorial policies normally require gossip columnists to have a source for all of their allegations to protect the publisher from lawsuits for defamation (libel).

In the United States, celebrities or public figures can sue for libel if their private lives are revealed in a gossip column and they believe that their reputation has been defamed – that is, exposed to hatred, contempt, ridicule, or pecuniary loss. Gossip columnists cannot defend against libel claims by arguing that they merely repeated but did not originate the defaming rumor or claim. Instead, a columnist must prove that the allegedly defaming statement was truthful or that it was based on a reasonably reliable source.

In the mid-1960s, rulings by the United States Supreme Court made it harder for the media to be sued for libel in the US. The Court ruled that libel occurs only if a publication prints falsehoods about a celebrity with "reckless disregard" for the truth. A celebrity suing a newspaper for libel must prove that the paper published the falsehood with actual malice or with deliberate knowledge that the statement was both incorrect and defamatory.

Moreover, the Court ruled that only factual misrepresentation, not expression of opinion, is libel. Thus, if gossip columnists write that they "think that Celebrity X is an idiot," the columnist does not face a risk of being sued for libel. On the other hand, if columnist invent an allegation that "Celebrity X is a wife beater" with no supporting source or evidence, the celebrity can sue for libel on the grounds that their reputation was defamed.

In some circumstances, however, gossip columnists do not fact check the information that they receiving from their source before they publishing their stories. Also, some gossip columnists who are not themselves reputable post articles about celebrities. As a result, there is a chance of published stories leading to the defamation of celebrities.

History

The precursors to gossip columns were the society columns of the 19th and early 20th centuries. James Gordon Bennett Sr. is credited with first creating this position at the New York Herald in 1840.

Walter Winchell, a gossip columnist famous in the 1930s and 1940s and the first to have a syndicated column, used political, entertainment, and social connections to mine information and rumors, which he either published in his column On Broadwayor used for trade or blackmail to accumulate more power. He has been referred to as "the most feared journalist" of his era.

In Hollywood's "Golden Age" in the 1930s and 1940s, gossip columnists were courted by the movie studios so that the studios could use gossip columns as a powerful publicity tool. During that period, the major film studios had "stables" of contractually-obligated actors and controlled nearly all aspects of the lives of their movie stars. From the 1930s to the 1950s, the two best-known Hollywood gossip columnists were the competing Hedda Hopper and Louella Parsons.

Well-timed leaks about a star's purported romantic adventures helped the studios to create and to sustain the public's interest in the studios' star actors. As well, the movie studios' publicity agents acted as unnamed "well-informed inside sources" and provided misinformation and rumors to counteract whispers about celebrity secrets, such as homosexuality or an out-of-wedlock child,  which could have severely damaged not only the reputation of the movie star in question but also the movie star's box office viability.

Having fallen into ill-repute after the heyday of Hopper and Parsons, gossip columnists saw a comeback in the 1980s. Many mainstream magazines such as Time, which would once have considered the idea of hiring gossip columnists to pen articles to have been beneath their stature, now have sections titled "People" or "Entertainment". Such mainstream gossip columns provide a light chatty glimpse into the private lives and misadventures of the rich and famous.

At the other end of the journalism spectrum, there are entire publications that deal primarily in gossip, rumor, and innuendo about celebrities, such as the British 'red-top' tabloids and the celebrity 'tell-all' magazines.

Notable gossip columnists

Notable gossip columnists include:

Columns not named for a columnist
Gossip columns that are not named after a specific columnist, along with the media source, include:

 3am — Daily Mirror, a British newspaper.
 Access Hollywood — a syndicated television program
 Bizarre — The Sun, a London newspaper
 Page Six — New York Post, a New York City newspaper
 Inside New York, in New York Post, New York City newspaper
 Inside the Beltway — The Washington Times, a Washington, D.C. newspaper
 Off the Record — The New York Observer, a New York newspaper
 Vegas Confidential — Las Vegas Review-Journal, a Las Vegas newspaper

See also
 Blind item
 Defamation
 Gossip
 Innuendo
 Roman à clef

References

 
Journalism occupations
Tabloid journalism